Van Halen was an American rock band active between 1972 and 2020. 

Van Halen or its variations may also refer to the following:

Music
Van Halen (album), the band "Van Halen"'s 1978 first studio album
Van Halen II, the band "Van Halen"'s 1979 second studio album
Van Halen III, the band "Van Halen"'s 1998 eleventh studio album

People

Musicians
Alex Van Halen (born 1953), the band Van Halen's drummer
Eddie Van Halen (1955–2020), the band Van Halen's guitarist
Wolfgang Van Halen (born 1991), the band Van Halen's bassist

Others
 Arnoud van Halen (1673–1732), Dutch painter
 Francisco de Paula Van Halen (1814–1887), Spanish painter 
 Juan Van Halen (1788–1864), Spanish military officer
 Juan Van-Halen Acedo (born 1944), Spanish poet
 Peter van Halen (1612–1687), Flemish Baroque painter

Other uses
Guitar Hero: Van Halen, a 2009 Guitar Hero video game based on the band "Van Halen"'s music

See also

 
 Halen
 Van (disambiguation)

Van Halen